LOS40 Music Awards, formerly known as Premios 40 Principales, is an award show by the musical radio station LOS40. It was created in 2006 to celebrate the fortieth anniversary of the founding of the worldwide station.

History
LOS40 is the most important music station in Spain, with 2,925,000 listeners in 2018, and the second-largest share of the country's radio audience just behind Cadena SER, under the PRISA group. It first began as a musical programme called Los 40 Principales in Madrid, from Cadena SER. After the program finished airing on 10 stations in the chain. At first, it lasted only two hours, then four, and then eight hours, when the program was transferred to the weekly edition on Saturday. The program was recorded and sent to all Cadena SER stations for broadcast, all at once, at the agreed time. Due to the success of the program, especially among young people, more and more hours of programming copaba and began to create his own style, the "Style 40" based on a language agile, dynamic, youthful, casual, for a very young audience where they compete in important music, music information and how to present the album. Wave Media was critical to convey that "Style 40" because we must not forget, the FM the tune a minority and Saturday afternoons Medium Wave stations emit eight hours of "Los 40" where listeners could choose the number 1.
Thanks to the success of the program, and increased FM transmitters and receivers, Los 40 Principales daily duration was increased until 1979, where it became a 24-hour standalone radiofórmula, still belonging to the Cadena SER. In 1985 began broadcasting via satellite and in the 1987-1988 season, constituted as radio station, Cadena 40 Principales, now independent of the Cadena SER, but still under the control of PRISA Group, who owns both chains.

Top 40 Waves received the award in the category National Radio in 1985. In 1998 both received Ondas Awards for Best Presenter Joaquin Luqui Musical Program and the 40 to 1 for Best TV Specialist Program. The program Your place or mine got in 2000 Ondas Award Most Innovative Radio Program, original and for their service to society. In 2004, the alarm Anda Ya! received the Innovation Award to radio waves. In 2010, Frank White was awarded the Gold Antenna Federation of Radio and Television Spain1.

Ceremonies

Categories
Spain
 Song
 Video
 Album
 Artist/Group
 Festival/Tour/Concert
 New Artist
Latin
 Latin Song
 Latin Artist/Group
International
 International Album
 International Song
 International Artist
 International New Artist
 International Video
America
 Song
 Album
 Pop Act
 Urban Act
 North Act
 Central Act
 South Act
 International Song
 International Act
 International New Act
 International Dance Act

All-time ranking

Los Premios 40 Principales España

Los Premios 40 Principales América

Performances

References

External links
 Official site

Spanish music awards
Latin American music
Los Premios 40 Principales